Anbumani Ramadoss is an Indian politician from Tamil Nadu, India. He rose to prominence as Vanniyar leader after 2010. He is a member of the Rajya Sabha, the upper house of the Parliament of India from Tamil Nadu.  Anbumani was the Minister of Health and Family Welfare in the First Manmohan Singh ministry from (2004–2009) as a part of the UPA government. He was elected to the Lok Sabha, the lower house of the Parliament of India from Dharmapuri, Tamil Nadu. He is also the president of the Pattali Makkal Katchi.

Early life and education
Anbumani was born on 9 October 1968 at Puducherry to S. Ramadoss and R. Saraswathi. S. Ramadoss was a physician by profession, who later founded the Pattali Makkal Katchi in 1989 in a agriculture based vanniyar family. Anbumani completed his SSLC from Montfort Boys Higher Secondary School, Yercaud in 1984 and finished his higher secondary in 1986 from St. Ann's Higher Secondary School, Tindivanam. He completed his MBBS from Madras Medical College. He spent a year and a half stint serving as a medical practitioner at Nallalam, a small village near Tindivanam. In 2003, Anbumani did a course on macro-economics from the London School of Economics.

Political career
Anbumani joined Pattali Makkal Katchi, founded by his father and became the youth wing president. In 2004, he became a member of the Rajya Sabha. He is a popular among vanniyar caste , a numerous caste of North Tamilnadu.

Minister of Health and Family Welfare

On 22 May 2004, Anbumani became as the Union Minister of Health and Family Welfare of the Government of India. At the time of induction into the Manmohan Singh's 2004 cabinet, Anbumani was the youngest Cabinet Minister in the Union Cabinet. During his tenure, the ministry set up various institutions like the Public Health Foundation of India, Department of Health Research, National Institute of Communicable Diseases, Food Safety and Standards Authority of India and the Traditional Knowledge Digital Library. As the Union Health Minister, Anbumani established the National Rural Health Mission (NRHM) in 2005 to provide primary health care to the women and children living in the rural parts of India. The project was lauded as 'the largest successful health scheme to be implemented anywhere in the world' by economist Jeffrey Sachs.

Under Anbumani, the ministry of health brought stringent regulations against the sale of tobacco products. Anbumani initiated a National Alcohol Policy for the first time in India and advocated for 2 October, the birthday of Mahatma Gandhi to be observed as World No-Alcohol day. Anbumani along with T D Dogra, the then Director of All India Institute of Medical Sciences (AIIMS), New Delhi expanded the institution to Jhajjar district, Haryana. New departments were established and redevelopment was carried out. National Institute of Siddha, Tambaram Sanatorium, Chennai was inaugurated by Anbumani on 3 September 2005.

Member of Parliament
He became a Member of Parliament from Dharmapuri Lok Sabha Constituency in 2014 as a part of the NDA with Bharatiya Janata Party. On 6 October 2015, Anbumani offered to quit the NDA if his decision could help find a permanent solution to the problems of the Sri Lankan Tamils.

Anbumani had the worst attendance of 15% among those from Tamil Nadu in both Houses as a  Rajya Sabha MP as of December 2019.

State assembly elections
Anbumani was declared as the Chief Ministerial Candidate from PMK for the 2016 Tamil Nadu Legislative Assembly elections. He contested from Pennagaram and lost by 18,446 vote.

During his campaign in Kancheepuram in 2019 he told cadres that it is only they who will be in the polling booths. He said to his party members “We will only be there. Then what? Do I need to say it out loud? You understood, right? That’s all, it’s done. Both of them have won.” Continuing in this vein, Anbumani also urges cadres, “There is no one in the opposing team to question us. So keep all this in your mind. My intention is that this region has to develop and that good plans should come here.” The Thiruporur police in April 2019 initiated steps for registering cases against  Anbumani Ramadoss for allegedly hinting at booth-capturing by his coalition parties to ensure success of their candidates in the April 18 elections.

Controversies

Arrest for hate speech 
Anbumani Ramadoss was arrested by Kancheepuram police in May 2013 in connection with an alleged hate speech case filed against him, the previous year. PMK workers set at least three buses on fire, and damaged over a hundred government buses by stone pelting. The police detained about 4,000 PMK workers around the state.

FIR on promoting caste enmity 
In March 2014, the Dharmapuri Police filed FIR on Anbumani Ramadoss and two others on charges of circulating CDs containing video/audio clips containing speeches by his father S Ramadoss and others on Marakkanam violence and Dharmapuri violence that could promote violence and hostility between two groups. A case against Ramdoss together with the PMK Deputy Secretary General and PMK District Secretary was registered under IPC sections relating to offenses including promoting hatred among various groups and issuing statements leading to public misbehavior and breaching Model Code of Conduct.

Awards and honors

The General Secretary of United Nations Ban Ki-moon described him as a 'public health champion'. President of India Shri Pranab Mukherjee presented him with a memento of appreciation on 29 March 2014 at the inauguration of Rotary International's Polio-Free Conclave 2014 in New Delhi. He was awarded with the Luther L. Terry Award by the American Cancer Society in 2006. Anbumani received World Health Organization Director General's Special Award for Leadership and Special Award for tobacco control in 2007. Rotary International awarded Polio Eradication Champion Award in 2007. The Rotary club of Madras presented Anbumani with a 'For the sake of Honour' award in recognition of his contribution to tobacco control and rural healthcare in 2008.

Personal life
Anbumani is married to Sowmiya and has three daughters. Anbumani heads a NGO Pasumai Thaayagam, which was founded in 1995 by his father S. Ramadoss. The NGO focuses on planting trees, desilting lakes and building check dams to conserve water. It also advocates for the welfare of Sri Lankan Tamils. Anbumani is currently the President of the Tamil Nadu Badminton Association. He advocates for the ban of alcohol and tobacco products.

References

External links
Official biographical sketch in Parliament of India website

|-

Health ministers of India
Union Ministers from Tamil Nadu
1968 births
Living people
Pattali Makkal Katchi politicians
Rajya Sabha members from Tamil Nadu
Madras Medical College alumni
India MPs 2014–2019
People from Viluppuram district
Lok Sabha members from Tamil Nadu
Tamil Nadu politicians